The 2005 DFS Classic was a women's tennis tournament played on grass courts at the Edgbaston Priory Club in Birmingham in the United Kingdom that was part of Tier III of the 2005 WTA Tour. The tournament was held from 6 June until 12 June 2005. First-seeded Maria Sharapova won the singles tile.

Finals

Singles

 Maria Sharapova defeated  Jelena Janković 6–2, 4–6, 6–1
 It was Sharapova's 3rd title of the year and the 13th of her career.

Doubles

 Daniela Hantuchová /  Ai Sugiyama defeated  Eleni Daniilidou /  Jennifer Russell 6–2, 6–3
 It was Hantuchová's 1st title of the year and the 7th of her career. It was Sugiyama's only title of the year and the 37th of her career.

External links
 ITF tournament edition details

DFS Classic
Birmingham Classic (tennis)
DFS Classic
DFS Classic